Torstein Tynning (4 June 1932 – 18 November 2000) was a Norwegian politician for the Conservative Party.

He was elected to the Norwegian Parliament from Telemark in 1965, and was re-elected on four occasions. He had previously served in the position of deputy representative during the term 1961–1965.

Tynning was born in Eidanger and was involved in local politics in Eidanger and its successor municipality Porsgrunn between 1959 and 1971.

He was the father of journalist Signe Tynning and grandfather of Labour politician Christian Tynning Bjørnø.

References

External links

1932 births
2000 deaths
Politicians from Porsgrunn
Conservative Party (Norway) politicians
Members of the Storting
Place of death missing
20th-century Norwegian politicians